The Hodek Hk-101 was a Czechoslovakian twin-engined, two seat light aircraft. Two prototypes were built in 1947, but development was abandoned after the 1948 Czechoslovak coup d'état.

Development and design
In 1942, Vincenc Hodek, the owner of V. Hodek Praha, an aircraft instruments manufacturer based in Prague, and Stanislav Kříž began work on the design of a small twin-engined light sporting aircraft. To avoid drawing the attention of the Nazi German supervisors of the factory, design work was carried out in secret at night in Hodek's apartment. After the end of German occupation, Hodkek applied for permission to start construction of prototypes of the new aircraft, the HK-101. Construction of the first prototype began in a rented workshop in Libeň, Prague, with Hodek recruiting experienced technicians from the recently disbanded German Junkers and Škoda-Kauba companies to work on the HK-101.  

The HK-101 was a low-wing cantilever monoplane of all-metal construction, with a retractable tailwheel undercarriage. It was powered by two  Walter Minor 4-III four-cylinder air-cooled inline engines in nacelles under the wings. The crew of two sat in tandem under a single side-hinging canopy, and were provided with dual controls, with the controls in the forward cockpit able to be easily disconnected. As well as the initial two-seater design, a single-seat version, and a version with larger wings was also planned.

While most Czechoslovak aviation companies were nationalised in 1945, Hodek's company remained in private hands at first, allowing construction of the prototype to continue, although it was slowed by strikes and by a shortage of funds. The first prototype was completed in the summer of 1947, with a wall of the workshop having to be demolished to allow the aircraft to be removed. The prototype made its first flight on 3 or 4 September, and was displayed (and flown) at an international airshow at Prague airport on 7 September. The HK-101 demonstrated good performance, and was considered suitable for use as a training aircraft, but had a very cramped cockpit, with poor visibility from the rear seat and not enough room to allow easy control from the front seat.

In January 1948, V. Hodek Praha was nationalised, with the new managers of the company uninterested in the HK-101, resulting in the partly built second prototype being handed over to Aero Vodochody for completion. In February 1948, the Czechoslovak Communist party seized control of the country, and although the second prototype flew in 1949, development was soon abandoned.

A fragment of the fin of the first prototype is preserved at the Prague Military History Institute.

Specifications

Notes

References

 
 
 

1940s Czechoslovakian sport aircraft
Aircraft first flown in 1947
Low-wing aircraft
Twin piston-engined tractor aircraft